Gangland is the twenty-first studio album by the band Kool & the Gang, released in 2001 following a five-year gap between albums. The album was a compilation of rappers backed by Kool and the Gang remaking some of the band's songs.

Track listing

Personnel

Robert "Kool" Bell - Bass guitar
Khalis Bayyan - Tenor sax, background vocals
Curtis Williams - Keyboards
George "Funky" Brown - Drums, background vocals
Dennis "D.T." Thomas - Alto Sax, background vocals
Charles Edward Smith - Guitar
Rick Iantosca - Guitar, keyboards
Jimmy Macon - Guitar
Clifford Adams - Trombone
Larry Gittens - Trumpet
Skip Martin - Trumpet

Devon - Performer
G'Poetic - Performer
Female - Performer
FM - Performer
The Juice - Performer
The Nep-Tunes - Performer
Nova Banda - Performer
R.O.C. - Performer
Rachid - Performer
Reign - Performer
Thunder - Performer
Shawn McQuiller - Background vocals
Felicia Moss - Background vocals
Carla - Background vocals
Kian Smith - Background vocals

Production
Don Tittle - Engineer
Kendal Stubbs - Mixing
Duncan Stanbury - Mastering
Khalis Bayyan - Mixing, Producer
Bill Irving - Programming, Mixing, Producer
Hakim Bell - Programming, Mixing, Producer
George "Funky" Brown - Programming, Producer
Rick Iantosca - Producer
Kool & the Gang - Executive Producer
Ronnie Wright - Photography

References

Kool & the Gang albums
2001 albums